Sohgo Ichikawa (born 30 July 2004) is a Japanese-born Hong Kong professional footballer who currently plays for Hong Kong Premier League club Kitchee.

Club career
In September 2020, Sohgo was promoted to the first team of Kitchee at the age of only 16.

International career
In September 2019, Sohgo had represented Hong Kong U-16 during the 2020 AFC U-16 Championship qualifiers. 

In October 2021, Sohgo was selected for the Hong Kong U-23 during the 2022 AFC U-23 Asian Cup qualifiers where he made his debut against Japan U-23.

On 19 July 2022, Sohgo made his international debut for Hong Kong in the 2022 EAFF E-1 Football Championship against Japan at the age of only 17.

In October 2021, Sohgo was selected for the Hong Kong U-20 during the 2023 AFC U-23 Asian Cup qualifiers. He scored a goal in the match against Timor-Leste U-20 but lost all 3 matches in the qualifiers.

Sohgo is called up for the Hong Kong U-23 preliminary squad once again for 2023 Merlion Cup held in Singapore from 24 to 26 March 2023 in preparation for the upcoming 2024 AFC U-23 Asian Cup qualifiers held in September 2023.

Career statistics

Club

International

Notes

References

Living people
2004 births
Hong Kong footballers
Hong Kong international footballers
Japanese emigrants to Hong Kong
Naturalized footballers of Hong Kong
Association football midfielders
Hong Kong Premier League players
Kitchee SC players